German submarine U-233 was a Type XB U-boat of Nazi Germany's Kriegsmarine during World War II.
She was laid down on 15 August 1941, launched on 8 May 1943 and commissioned on 22 September of the same year. U-233 was commanded throughout her career by Oberleutnant zur See Hans Steen.

Service history
U-233 was assigned to the 4th U-boat Flotilla for training on 22 September 1943 and to the 12th U-boat Flotilla on 1 June 1944 for active service.
Her first and only patrol commenced on 27 May 1944 when she departed Kiel to lay mines off Halifax.

Fate
On 5 July 1944 U-233 was intercepted by ships of the  hunter-killer group. 
32 of her crew were killed in the action, 29 others being rescued by the escorts. Steen was also picked up, but died of wounds the next day.

 US Navy report on U-233 survivors 1944

References

Bibliography

External links

German Type X submarines
World War II submarines of Germany
1943 ships
Ships built in Kiel
U-boats sunk in 1944
U-boats sunk by US warships
World War II shipwrecks in the Atlantic Ocean
U-boats sunk in collisions
U-boats commissioned in 1943
Maritime incidents in July 1944